Taryenyawagon (Onondaga Taiñhiawa'geh) or "Holder of the Heavens" is the creator deity in Iroquois mythology.

Iroquois mythology
Gods of the indigenous peoples of North America
Creator gods